Iranian Workers' Solidarity Network often abbreviated as IWSN, is an international  network of Iranian trade union and workers' right activists. Established in 2001, it currently has chapters in 13 countries around the world.

See also
 Syndicate of Workers of Tehran and Suburbs Bus Company
 Mansour Osanlou

References

Resources
 About Iranian Workers' Solidarity Network, IWSN website

External links
 IWSN English website
 IWSN Farsi website

Trade unions in Iran
Trade unions established in 2000